Bisei Dam  is a gravity concrete & fill dam (compound) dam located in Hokkaido Prefecture in Japan. The dam is used for irrigation. The catchment area of the dam is 83 km2. The dam impounds about 66  ha of land when full and can store 9400 thousand cubic meters of water. The construction of the dam was started on 1975 and completed in 1999.

References

Dams in Hokkaido